Jaime Loyola (27 May 1931 – 23 May 1993) was a Puerto Rican sports shooter. He competed in the trap event at the 1964 Summer Olympics.

References

1931 births
1993 deaths
People from Santurce, Puerto Rico
Puerto Rican male sport shooters
Olympic shooters of Puerto Rico
Shooters at the 1964 Summer Olympics
Pan American Games medalists in shooting
Pan American Games bronze medalists for Puerto Rico
Shooters at the 1955 Pan American Games
20th-century Puerto Rican people